The 2012 McGrath Cup  is a Gaelic football competition played by the teams of Munster GAA. The competition differs from the Munster Senior Football Championship as it also features further education colleges and the winning team does not progress to another tournament at All-Ireland level. The competition was won by Cork, defeating Tipperary in the final by seven points.

McGrath Cup

First round

Quarter-finals

Semi-finals

Final

See also
 2012 Dr. McKenna Cup

References

McGrath Cup
McGrath Cup